The following is a list of players, both past and current, who appeared in at least one game for the Phoenix Super LPG Fuel Masters PBA franchise. Statistics are accurate as of the 2022–23 PBA Commissioner's Cup.

Players

|-
| align=left| || align=left| || G/F || align=left| || 1 ||  || 3 || 11 || 0 || 1 || 0 || 
|-
| align=left| || align=left| || F || align=left| || 3 || – || 44 || 1,284 || 663 || 480 || 167 || 
|-
| bgcolor="#cfecec" align=left|^ || align=left| || F/C || align=left| || 1 || –present || 9 || 45 || 9 || 14 || 3 || 
|-
| bgcolor="#FFCC00" align=left|+ || align=left| || F || align=left| || 1 ||  || 2 || 70 || 31 || 41 || 1 || 
|-
| bgcolor="#cfecec" align=left|^ || align=left| || G || align=left| || 1 || –present || || || || || || 
|-
| align=left| || align=left| || G || align=left| || 2 || – || 53 || 747 || 320 || 89 || 65 || 
|-
| align=left| || align=left| || F || align=left| || 2 || – || 19 || 461 || 202 || 121 || 56 || 
|-
| align=left| || align=left| || G/F || align=left| || 2 || – || 40 || 989 || 355 || 124 || 111 || 
|-
| align=left| || align=left| || G || align=left| || 1 ||  || 14 || 430 || 172 || 49 || 58 || 
|-
| align=left| || align=left| || F || align=left| || 1 ||  || 11 || 228 || 104 || 29 || 12 || 
|-
| align=left| || align=left| || F || align=left| || 2 || – || 39 || 631 || 242 || 127 || 32 || 
|-
| align=left| || align=left| || F/C || align=left| || 1 ||  || 11 || 164 || 54 || 61 || 4 || 
|-
| bgcolor="#FFCC00" align=left|+ || align=left| || F/C || align=left nowrap| || 1 ||  || 6 || 255 || 209 || 106 || 22 || 
|-
| align=left| || align=left| || G || align=left| || 1 ||  || 13 || 147 || 67 || 16 || 8 || 
|-
| align=left| || align=left| || F || align=left| || 1 ||  || 9 || 67 || 14 || 14 || 2 || 
|-
| bgcolor="#cfecec" align=left|^ || align=left| || F || align=left| || 2 || –present || 20 || 191 || 49 || 50 || 9 || 
|-
| align=left| || align=left| || F/C || align=left| || 2 || – || 23 || 306 || 102 || 82 || 5 || 
|-
| align=left| || align=left| || G/F || align=left| || 2 || – || 26 || 768 || 332 || 107 || 98 || 
|-
| align=left| || align=left| || F/C || align=left| || 4 || –2022 || 109 || 2,155 || 863 || 490 || 77 || 
|-
| align=left| || align=left| || F || align=left| || 1 ||  || 4 || 12 || 0 || 3 || 1 || 
|-
| align=left| || align=left| || G || align=left| || 1 ||  || 12 || 170 || 55 || 15 || 23 || 
|-
| align=left| || align=left| || G || align=left| || 2 || – || 39 || 436 || 133 || 46 || 32 || 
|-
| align=left| || align=left| || G || align=left| || 1 || 2021–2022 || 23 || 230 || 67 || 67 || 7 || 
|-
| align=left| || align=left| || G || align=left| || 1 ||  || 29 || 175 || 41 || 38 || 17 || 
|-
| bgcolor="#FFCC00" align=left|+ || align=left| || F || align=left| || 1 ||  || 2 || 82 || 34 || 28 || 3 || 
|-
| align=left| || align=left| || G || align=left| || 2 || – || 26 || 780 || 273 || 57 || 97 || 
|-
| align=left| || align=left nowrap| || F || align=left| || 2 || – || 35 || 365 || 173 || 85 || 13 || 
|-
| align=left| || align=left| || F/C || align=left| || 1 ||  || 3 || 14 || 2 || 2 || 0 || 
|-
| align=left| || align=left| || G/F || align=left| || 1 ||  || 3 || 16 || 6 || 1 || 1 || 
|-
| align=left| || align=left| || G || align=left| || 1 ||  || 2 || 18 || 4 || 3 || 5 || 
|-
| align=left| || align=left| || G || align=left| || 3 || – || 32 || 166 || 48 || 17 || 25 || 
|-
| bgcolor="#cfecec" align=left|^ || align=left| || G || align=left| || 5 || –present || 86 || 1,533 || 588 || 167 || 179 || 
|-
| bgcolor="#FFCC00" align=left|+ || align=left| || F || align=left| || 1 ||  || 4 || 178 || 126 || 40 || 10 || 
|-
| bgcolor="#cfecec" align=left|^ || align=left| || G || align=left| || 1 || –present ||  || || || || || 
|-
| align=left| || align=left| || G/F || align=left| || 2 || – || 18 || 75 || 34 || 9 || 3 || 
|-
| bgcolor="#FFCC00" align=left|+ || align=left| || F || align=left| || 1 ||  || 5 || 168 || 88 || 60 || 23 || 
|-
| align=left| || align=left| || F || align=left| || 3 || – || 21 || 93 || 24 || 10 || 8 || 
|-
| align=left| || align=left| || G || align=left| || 1 ||  || 17 || 338 || 91 || 49 || 36 || 
|-
| bgcolor="#FFCC00" align=left|+ || align=left| || C || align=left| || 1 || align=center| || 9 || 326 || 205 || 150 || 25 || 
|-
| align=left| || align=left| || F || align=left| || 5 || – || 123 || 2,268 || 817 || 421 || 175 ||
|-
| align=left| || align=left| || G/F || align=left| || 1 ||  || 4 || 13 || 1 || 4 || 0 || 
|-
| bgcolor="#cfecec" align=left|^ || align=left| || G || align=left| || 6 || –present || 162 || 4,278 || 1,553 || 458 || 436 || 
|-
| align=left| || align=left| || G || align=left| || 1 ||  || 3 || 10 || 0 || 0 || 1 || 
|-
| align=left| || align=left| || F/C || align=left| || 3 || – || 90 || 1,336 || 340 || 394 || 46 || 
|-
| bgcolor="#cfecec" align=left|^ || align=left| || F || align=left| || 1 || –present || 16 || 141 || 51 || 23 || 3 || 
|-
| align=left| || align=left| || G || align=left| || 2 || – || 48 || 555 || 173 || 56 || 60 || 
|-
| bgcolor="#FFCC00" align=left|+ || align=left| || G || align=left| || 1 ||  || 13 || 245 || 116 || 42 || 20 || 
|-
| bgcolor="#cfecec" align=left|^ || align=left| || G || align=left| || 1 || –present || 10 || 101 || 31 || 12 || 3 || 
|-
| align=left| || align=left| || G/F || align=left| || 2 || – || 48 || 1144 || 364 || 162 || 134 || 
|-
| bgcolor="#cfecec" align=left|^ || align=left| || F || align=left| || 2 || –present || 26 || 444 || 137 || 65 || 16 || 
|-
| align=left| || align=left| || F || align=left| || 1 ||  || 11 || 229 || 141 || 58 || 16 || 
|-
| align=left| || align=left| || F/C || align=left| || 2 || – || 52 || 515 || 144 || 104 || 25 || 
|-
| bgcolor="#cfecec" align=left nowrap|^+ || align=left| || F || align=left| || 2 || 2022–present || 4 || 176 || 110 || 55 || 16 || 
|-
| bgcolor="#FFCC00" align=left|+ || align=left| || F/C || align=left| || 1 ||  || 11 || 461 || 262 || 190 || 29 || 
|-
| align=left| || align=left| || G || align=left| || 2 || – || 32 || 356 || 153 || 41 || 41 || 
|-
| align=left| || align=left| || F || align=left| || 2 || – || 43 || 587 || 137 || 111 || 28 || 
|-
| align=left| || align=left| || F/C || align=left| || 2 || – || 31 || 175 || 47 || 40 || 5 || 
|-
| bgcolor="#cfecec" align=left|^ || align=left| || F || align=left| || 1 || –present || 23 || 725 || 280 || 161 || 57 || 
|-
| align=left| || align=left| || G || align=left| || 1 ||  || 11 || 201 || 57 || 23 || 38 || 
|-
| bgcolor="#cfecec" align=left|^ || align=left| || F/C || align=left| || 2 || –present || 34 || 316 || 118 || 84 || 6 || 
|-
| align=left| || align=left| || F || align=left| || 3 || – || 40 || 377 || 113 || 86 || 10 || 
|-
| align=left| || align=left| || F || align=left| || 2 || – || 39 || 456 || 102 || 118 || 29 || 
|-
| align=left| || align=left| || C || align=left| || 1 ||  || 23 || 257 || 85 || 50 || 10 || 
|-
| bgcolor="#cfecec" align=left|^ || align=left| || F || align=left| || 5 || –present || 131 || 4,026 || 1,722 || 916 || 227 || 
|-
| bgcolor="#FFCC00" align=left|+ || align=left| || F || align=left| || 4 || – || 42 || 1,747 || 1,303 || 771 || 177 || 
|-
| bgcolor="#FFCC00" align=left|+ || align=left| || F/C || align=left| || 1 ||  || 9 || 332 || 211 || 117 || 19 || 
|-
| align=left| || align=left| || F/C || align=left| || 2 || 2022,  || 13 || 120 || 22 || 7 || 5 || 
|-
| align=left| || align=left| || G || align=left| || 1 ||  || 7 || 63 || 14 || 3 || 6 || 
|-
| align=left| || align=left| || G || align=left| || 2 || – || 54 || 1,075 || 234 || 160 || 179 || 
|-
| align=left| || align=left| || F/C || align=left| || 1 ||  || 8 || 73 || 12 || 10 || 5 || 
|-
| align=left| || align=left| || G/F || align=left| || 3 || – || 63 || 600 || 151 || 73 || 33 || 
|-
| align=left| || align=left| || G/F || align=left| || 2 || 2022,  || 17 || 146 || 44 || 34 || 7 || 
|-
| align=left| || align=left| || F || align=left| || 1 || 2022 || 1 || 5 || 0 || 0 || 0 || 
|-
| bgcolor="#cfecec" align=left|^ || align=left| || G || align=left| || 1 || –present || 22 || 362 || 209 || 74 || 40 || 
|-
| bgcolor="#FFCC00" align=left|+ || align=left| || G || align=left| || 1 ||  || 3 || 114 || 56 || 33 || 12 || 
|-
| align=left| || align=left| || G || align=left| || 1 ||  || 3 || 8 || 2 || 1 || 0 || 
|-
| bgcolor="#cfecec" align=left|^ || align=left| || C || align=left| || 1 || –present || || || || || || 
|-
| bgcolor="#FFCC00" align=left|+ || align=left| || F || align=left| || 1 || 2022 || 4 || 141 || 65 || 39 || 8 || 
|-
| align=left| || align=left| || G || align=left| || 1 ||  || 6 || 30 || 0 || 2 || 0 || 
|-
| bgcolor="#cfecec" align=left|^ || align=left| || G || align=left| || 1 || –present || 24 || 690 || 297 || 53 || 61 || 
|-
| align=left| || align=left| || F/C || align=left| || 2 || – || 36 || 508 || 143 || 138 || 14 || 
|-
| align=left| || align=left| || G || align=left| || 1 ||  || 20 || 370 || 157 || 39 || 46 || 
|-
| align=left| || align=left| || G || align=left| || 1 ||  || 3 || 19 || 8 || 0 || 3 || 
|-
| bgcolor="#FFCC00" align=left|+ || align=left| || F/C || align=left| || 1 ||  || 13 || 523 || 240 || 220 || 58 || 
|-
| bgcolor="#FFCC00" align=left|+ || align=left| || F/C || align=left| || 1 ||  || 4 || 139 || 101 || 53 || 9 || 
|-
| align=left| || align=left| || G || align=left| || 2 || – || 40 || 431 || 175 || 76 || 14 || 
|-
| align=left| || align=left| || F || align=left| || 4 || – || 98 || 2,023 || 508 || 459 || 138 || 
|-
| align=left| || align=left| || G/F || align=left| || 6 || – || 148 || 5,080 || 2,642 || 741 || 720 || 
|}

References

all-time roster